The Muslim School Holiday Campaign  began when Shujaat Khan's children had to choose between celebrating the Eid holidays or going to school.

History 
In 2006, the New York Civic Participation Project attempted to pass the Muslim School Holiday Resolution followed by allied groups. The resolution, numbered 1281, was passed unanimously in 2008. Mayor Michael Bloomberg vetoed the resolution.

Five years later, Bill de Blasio, at the time New York City Public Advocate, promised to recognize the two Muslim Holidays, Eid ul-Fitr and Eid ul-Adha.

In 2015, after 16 years of working with various leaders and institutions, Shujaat Khan, NYCPP, La Fuente, 32BJ SEIU were successful in addiong these school holidays to the New York City public school calendar.

At a speech celebrating the victory, Shujaat Khan stated that the struggle for equality and recognition is not over, but a huge step forward had been made.

References

New York City Department of Education
Islam in New York City